The International Hans Gabor Belvedere Singing Competition is an annual competition for young opera singers. It has been described as "THE 'springboard' for a career in opera", or the "singers' stock exchange, the 'Wall Street of Voices'".

Hans Gabor (founder of the Wiener Kammeroper) created the contest in 1982 to promote the careers of emerging opera artists. Categories for operetta and accompaniment were added later. The competition is judged by a panel of opera managers, agents, and media representatives. Competitors from around the world participate, with the qualifying round of competition taking place in 50 cities. A number of different prizes are awarded, including cash and opera engagements.

The competition was the subject of a 2012 documentary film, Wall Street of Voices.

References

External links
Official site

Opera competitions